Castiarina festiva is a species of beetle in the jewel beetle family, Buprestidae, found in Australia.

References 

festiva
Beetles described in 1916
Beetles of Australia